Pavel Jirkal (born 10 April 1983) is a Czech darts player currently playing in Professional Darts Corporation (PDC) events.

Career 
Pavel started playing at the age of 14 and is one of the most experienced Czech players.

In 2001 he won Czech Open, a tournament organised by the British Darts Organisation (BDO), when he defeated another Czech player, Radek Schulz. A year later, he became the World champion U21 in soft-tip darts.

He took part in bigger international tournaments in 2004 and 2005, when he competed in the major tournament World Masters. In 2008 he got a chance to play in four tournaments of PDPA Players Championship, twice he made it among last 64. During years he won many national single and doubles titles.

A bartender by trade, in 2015, he represented his country with Michal Kočík in the 2015 PDC World Cup of Darts, but they were defeated 5–2 in the first round by the Austrian duo of Mensur Suljović and Rowby-John Rodriguez. He made it into last 144 on 2015 World Masters, the same result he repeated in 2017.

Jirkal became Runner-up after losing to Martin Heneghan from Ireland of the 2018 WDF Europe Cup. In November he played an exhibition tournament Prague Darts Masters.

He attended European Q-School in 2019, where he reached the final on Day 3, but lost to Christian Bunse, and he would lose to the Day 4 winner Darius Labanauskas the following day, missing out on a Tour Card. He did then qualify as the East European qualifier for the 2019 European Darts Open in Leverkusen, Germany and also to the 2019 German Darts Open in Saarbrücken. In the first tournament he won 6-1 over William Borland and made it into the second round, where he lost 3-6 to Darren Webster. In the second tournament he lost 0-6 to Luke Humphries. In June he represented Czech republic along with Karel Sedláček in 2019 World Cup of Darts. The Czech republic team lost in the first round with Poland (Krzysztof Ratajski and Tytus Kanik) 2-5.

In early 2020 he participated in PDC European Q-school, three time he made it into last 128, once he was eliminated in last 512. In April 2020 he became one of the ten players of newly found 2020 Tipsport Premier League. It was not really successful journey for him, with just two victories, over Michal Ondo and Daniel Barbořák, he finished 9th after Phase 1 and was eliminated from the tournament.

Major tournaments results 

WDF

BDO

PDC

References

External links

Living people
Czech darts players
Professional Darts Corporation associate players
1983 births
PDC World Cup of Darts Czech team